Charley Esmee Hull (born 20 March 1996) is an English professional golfer who has achieved success both on the Ladies European Tour and the LPGA Tour, winning honours as Rookie of the Year, becoming the youngest competitor to participate in the international Solheim Cup matches and becoming a champion on the European circuit in 2014 before the age of 18. In 2016, she won the prestigious CME Group Tour Championship, the season-ending event of the LPGA Tour.

Early life
Hull was first introduced to golf aged two, and began playing with her father at Kettering Golf Club. She left school aged 13 to be home schooled, and started playing in amateur tournaments.

Amateur career
Hull came to public attention aged 9, when she won a significant 18-hole handicap event against adults with a score of 28 stableford points from a handicap of 26  at Turnberry. Aged 10 she played alongside Morgan Pressel in the British Open Pro-Am. Hull then won several amateur events in the United States and Great Britain and has ranked in the top-10 of the World Amateur Golf Ranking, reaching a high of number three in the world.

Hull played on the Great Britain and Ireland Curtis Cup team in 2012. She lost her fourballs and foursomes matches on the first two days but won her singles match on the final day as the GB&I team beat the United States team 10½–9½. She had initially been removed from the team in a dispute with the Ladies Golf Union over a mandatory training session that conflicted with the Kraft Nabisco Championship, a major championship on the LPGA Tour, to which Hull had been invited. The LGU re-instated Hull to the team and Hull finished tied for 38th at the Kraft Nabisco Championship.

Hull also competed in the 2012 Women's British Open, where she was tied for third after the first round.

Professional career
Hull turned professional on 1 January 2013. She made her professional debut in March 2013 and reeled off five consecutive second-place finishes on the Ladies European Tour: Lalla Meryem Cup, South African Women's Open, Turkish Airlines Ladies Open, Deloitte Ladies Open and a playoff loss at the UniCredit Ladies German Open. 

With five additional top-ten finishes on the Ladies European Tour, she finished sixth on the tour's Order of Merit with earnings of just under €135,995 in fifteen official events. With her strong debut on the tour, Hull was awarded the 2013 LET Rookie of the Year award and was voted the Best International Newcomer by the Sports Journalists' Association and presented with the Peter Wilson Trophy at the SJA British Sports Awards Hull was also on the shortlist for the BBC's Young Sports Personality of the Year, losing to 16-year-old swimmer Josef Craig. 

In August 2013, Hull was selected by European Solheim Cup captain Liselotte Neumann to compete in the 2013 Solheim Cup, the youngest person ever to play in the tournament. The team was the first European Solheim squad to win on U.S. soil, with a final score of 18–10. Hull contributed 2 points, including a 5 & 4 singles win over Paula Creamer. Neumann later praised Hull's performance.

On 16 March 2014, four days shy of her 18th birthday, Hull won her first professional title at the Lalla Meryem Cup in Morocco. Having a five shot deficit to the overnight leader, Gwladys Nocera, Hull scored a bogey-free round of 62 (−9) to finish level with Nocera and force a playoff. Hull birdied the first sudden-death hole to secure the victory. She ended the 2014 season by becoming the youngest player to win the Ladies European Tour Order of Merit.

During 2015, Hull played on both the Ladies European Tour and on the LPGA Tour, where she improved her priority ranking such that she was able to play full time on that tour. Since then, she has played predominantly on the LPGA Tour. In 2016, she had five top-ten finishes and won for the first time on the tour at the season ending CME Group Tour Championship, which lifted her to fourth place in the final Race to the CME Globe points standings.

On 12 January 2019, Hull won the Fatima Bint Mubarak Ladies Open at the Saadiyat Beach Golf Club in Abu Dhabi.

In June 2020, during a suspension of all the major golf tours due to the COVID-19 pandemic, Hull won the opening event of the Rose Ladies Series in the United Kingdom, and in early August, finished second in the final event to top the series standings ahead of Georgia Hall. After the tours had resumed, in late August she missed the halfway cut at the AIG Women's Open, the first major of the year. In September, she tested positive for COVID-19 during pre-tournament testing for the ANA Inspiration and was forced to withdraw from the year's second major. In October, she finished in a tie for 7th place in the Women's PGA Championship.

Personal life
Hull's mother and her maternal grandparents are Polish. She has two half-sisters, one from each parent.

Based at Woburn Golf Club, Hull spends her winters with her family based in Florida.

Hull has publicly spoken out against single-sex golf clubs. When asked by the BBC if she had experienced discrimination on the course, she recounted that when she was seven years old she defeated a 17-year-old boy and he swore at her after the match.

Hull married Ozzie Smith, a mixed martial arts fighter, in her hometown on the 21 September 2019.

Amateur wins
2011 Ione D Jones/Doherty Championship, Welsh Ladies Open Stroke Play Championship, English Women's Open Amateur Stroke Play Championship
2012 Harder Hall Invitational

Professional wins (6)

LPGA Tour wins (2)

Ladies European Tour wins (3)

LET playoff record (1–3)

Other wins (1)
2020 Rose Ladies Series – Event 1

Results in LPGA majors
Results generally not in chronological order.

CUT = Missed the half-way cut
NT = No tournament
T = tied

Summary

Most consecutive cuts made – 10 (2014 ANA – 2016 Women's PGA)
Longest streak of top-10s – 3 (2018 ANA – 2018 Women's PGA)

World ranking
Position in Women's World Golf Rankings at the end of each calendar year.

Team appearances
Amateur
European Ladies' Team Championship (representing England): 2011
Junior Vagliano Trophy: (representing Great Britain & Ireland): 2011
Junior Solheim Cup (representing Europe): 2011
European Girls' Team Championship (representing the England): 2012
Curtis Cup (representing Great Britain & Ireland): 2012 (winners)
Espirito Santo Trophy (representing England): 2012

Professional
Solheim Cup (representing Europe): 2013 (winners), 2015, 2017, 2019 (winners), 2021 (winners)
International Crown (representing England): 2016, 2018

Solheim Cup record

References

External links

English female golfers
Ladies European Tour golfers
LPGA Tour golfers
Solheim Cup competitors for Europe
Olympic golfers of Great Britain
Golfers at the 2016 Summer Olympics
Sportspeople from Kettering
English people of Polish descent
1996 births
Living people